Kingston is an American country music duo consisting of twin brothers, Joshua Scott Carter and Zachary Edward Carter. Until September 2011, Kingston was known as the Carter Twins and released their debut single, "Heart Like Memphis", on March 16, 2009.

Biography 
Kingston grew up in Hudson, Ohio, and were surrounded by music from the time they were born. Their mother worked in country radio and encouraged their interest. Zach stole time at her piano, while she taught Josh “Stairway to Heaven” on the guitar. In 2008, the Carter Twins scored a chance meeting with executive in Los Angeles, who ultimately led them to CMT. The brothers completed high school and moved to Nashville, Tennessee to pursue their music career full-time under the development of CMT Music, as the first act on the new label.

Their debut single with the CMT Music label was released in March 2009, and reached a peak of number 54 on the U.S. Billboard Hot Country Songs. They were reported to having been working on their self-titled debut album with producer Frank Rogers, with an expected release date of August 2009, although it was never released. The duo wrote over 80 songs for the album, including co-writes from the members of Lady Antebellum. Ultimately, however, it was announced on September 22, 2009 that the Carter Twins had parted ways with CMT. 

Although their self-titled debut album was never released, the duo released a 4-song digital EP titled Carter Twins on November 3, 2009. The EP features their single "Heart Like Memphis." 

In September 2011, the duo posted a YouTube video announcing the duo's name change to Kingston.

Band 
Mark Trussell - Electric guitar
Brian Howell - Bass guitar
Tommy Perkinson - Drums

Discography

Extended plays

Singles

Music videos

References

External links 
Carter Twins on CMT
Carter Twins on MySpace.com

Country music duos
Sibling musical duos
Musical groups established in 2008